Scopula rhodinaria is a moth of the  family Geometridae. It is found in Yemen (Socotra).

References

Moths described in 1907
rhodinaria
Endemic fauna of Socotra
Moths of Asia